Schechter Manhattan   is a K-8 independent Jewish day school located in the Upper West Side of Manhattan, New York City. The school adheres to a progressive or constructivist educational philosophy, which espouses the value of experiential learning and self-reflection.

History
Schechter Manhattan opened in 1996 with Dr. S. Lorch as the founding Head of School.  The first eighth graders graduated in June 2006; alumni have gone on to a wide range of excellent independent, Jewish, and public high schools including but not limited to: Bard, Beacon, Dalton, Heschel, High School of Math, Science & Engineering, Horace Mann, LaGuardia, Ramaz, SAR, Schechter School of Westchester, Stuyvesant, and Trinity.

The elementary division (K-5) and the middle school division (6–8) are each led by a Division Head.

Schechter Manhattan is a member of the Independent Schools Association of Greater New York (ISAAGNY). Additionally, the school is a full member of New York State Association of Independent Schools (NYSAIS). The school is governed by a board of trustees and advised by both an Education Committee and a Rabbinic Advisory Committee.

In January 2011, the entire school moved into a new building at 805 Columbus Avenue. Prior to that time, the kindergarten and first-grade classes met at the Park Avenue Synagogue and the rest of the school, grades 2–8, was located on the Upper West Side at 15 West 86th Street, in the building of the Society for the Advancement of Judaism.

References

External links
Schechter Manhattan Official Website

Jewish day schools in New York (state)
Educational institutions established in 1995
Upper West Side
Private elementary schools in Manhattan
Private middle schools in Manhattan
Jews and Judaism in Manhattan
Progressive education
Constructivism
1995 establishments in New York City
Jewish organizations based in New York City